Tennessee Technological University, commonly referred to as Tennessee Tech, is a public research university in Cookeville, Tennessee. It was formerly known as Tennessee Polytechnic Institute, and before that as University of Dixie, the name under which it was founded as a private institution. Affiliated with the Tennessee Board of Regents, the university is governed by a board of trustees. It is classified among "R2: Doctoral Universities – High research activity".

As an institute of technology, Tennessee Tech places special emphasis on undergraduate education in fields related to engineering, technology, and computer science, although degrees in education, liberal arts, agriculture, nursing, and other fields of study can be pursued as well. Additionally, there are graduate and doctorate offerings in engineering, education, business, and the liberal arts. As of the 2018 fall semester, Tennessee Tech enrolls more than 10,000 students (9,006 undergraduate and 1,180 graduate students), and its campus has 87 buildings on  centered along Dixie Avenue in northern Cookeville.

Tennessee Tech athletic teams, named the Golden Eagles, compete in the National Collegiate Athletic Association (NCAA) Division I as a member of the Ohio Valley Conference.

History

Tennessee Tech is rooted in the University of Dixie (colloquially known as Dixie College), which was chartered in 1909 and began operations in 1912. It struggled with funding and enrollment, however, and the campus was deeded to local governments. In 1915, the state government assumed control of the campus and chartered the new school as Tennessee Polytechnic Institute. The new school included just 13 faculty members and 19 students during the 1916–17 academic year and consisted of just 18 acres of undeveloped land with one administrative building and two student dorms. Due to the rural nature of the school, students also worked in the school garden to grow and prepare their own meals. In 1929, the first class graduated with four-year bachelor's degrees. Tennessee Polytechnic Institute was elevated to university status in 1965, when its name changed to Tennessee Technological University.

Buildings on campus

Educational or administrative

Roaden University Center (RUC), often simply called the UC. Built in 1971 and named for Arliss Roaden, president of the university from 1974 to 1985, this building houses the campus information center (Campus Compass), administrative offices for the Offices of Financial Aid, Disabilities, Communications and Marketing, and Eagle Card. It also contains the university's bookstore, the Women's Center, the Counseling Center, post office, and primary dining areas. The Joan Derryberry Art Gallery and the university's student-run radio station, WTTU, are also located here.
Ashraf Islam Engineering Building (IEB) which broke ground in September 2021 will become the new home of the College of Engineering and will house classrooms and laboratories dedicated to the several engineering departments Tennessee Tech supports. The building is being constructed on the site of Sherlock Park, and will be complete in the early-to-mid 2020s.
Bartoo Hall (BART) houses the College of Education's curriculum and instruction department, and much of its activity centers around smart classrooms and the Learning Resources Center. It is also the home of the Horace M. Jeffers Twenty-First Century Production and Teaching Laboratories. Constructed in 1916 as the men's dormitory for Tennessee Polytechnic Institute, this building was originally known simply as West Hall. It was later home to the university's biology department and is named for Dorr R. Bartoo, a former head of the biology department. Bartoo is undergoing renovations as of July 2018.
Brown Hall (BRWN) is home to the mechanical, electrical, and computer engineering departments and the Center for Manufacturing Research. About 20 labs are located in the building for research related to these fields. It also features the DENSO Mechanical Engineering Smart Classroom. Situated on the southern side of the engineering quad, this building is named for James Seay Brown, former chairperson of the Department of Mechanical Engineering.
Bruner Hall (BRUN) is home to the mathematics, physics, and computer science departments. Situated on the northern side of the engineering quad, this building is named for Clarence V. Bruner, dean of faculty from 1961 to 1963.

Bryan Fine Arts Building (BFA) is home to the College of Fine Arts as well as the Wattenbarger Auditorium. Constructed in 1981, this building is named for Charles Faulkner Bryan, head of the Department of Music from 1936 to 1939. Artwork by faculty and students is exhibited in the building, and several instruments from the Charles F. Bryan Folk Instrument Collection, including numerous Appalachian dulcimers, are on display in the lobby.
Clement Hall (CLEM) is home to the College of Engineering and the Department of Basic Engineering. The building is also home to the D.W. Mattson Computer Center, which includes the administrative offices and data center of the information technology services department. Situated on the eastern side of the engineering quad, Clement Hall was constructed in the mid-1960s and is named for Frank G. Clement, former governor of Tennessee (1953–1959, 1963–1967). The computer center is named for Dale W. Mattson, the engineering professor who acquired the university's first computer, an IBM 650, in the 1960s.
Derryberry Hall (DBRY) is the signature building on campus. It is home to the Offices of the President and Provost as well as the Offices of Admissions, the Bursar, Records and Registration, Institutional Research, University Development, University Advancement, Graduate Studies, and International Affairs. The building is also the home to the university's main auditorium, Derryberry Auditorium. The oldest building on campus, Derryberry was constructed in 1912 for the university's predecessor, Dixie College, though it has undergone numerous renovations since then. It is named after Everett Derryberry, president of the university from 1940 to 1974. The building's iconic colonial-style clock tower is equipped with a carillon that chimes every quarter-hour and plays selected pieces at 5 p.m. and 10 p.m. daily.
Foundation Hall (FNDH) is the location of the university police, the Small Business Development Center, and the College of Fine Arts' art education program. The building was formerly the home of Prescott Middle School. The non-profit TTU Foundation purchased the building from Putnam County in 2009.

 Foster Hall (FOST) is former home to the Department of Chemistry. Constructed in 1964, the building is named for Dr. Ferris U. Foster, a former department chairperson. The building was vacated on the Spring of 2021, when the Chemistry Department moved to the newly constructed Laboratory Science Commons (LSC). Foster Hall is slated for demolition in 2022.
 Foundry (FDRY) is used by the Manufacturing and Engineering Technology Department for metal casting.
Henderson Hall (HEND) is home to the College of Arts and Sciences, the general curriculum program, and the English and history departments. Constructed in 1931, the building is named in honor of James Manson Henderson, the first director of the university's School of Engineering. Henderson Hall is listed on the National Register of Historic Places, primarily for its architecture. The building was designed by Benjamin F. Hunt, who worked for the firm of noted regional architect R. H. Hunt.
Jere Whitson Hall (JWB), or Jere Whitson Memorial Building, is the home of the university's enrollment operations, including undergraduate admissions, financial aid, scholarships, records and registration, new student and family programs, the graduation office, and military and veterans' affairs. The building also houses the Backdoor Playhouse, the campus theater, on its lower level. Named for a founder of Dixie College, this building was constructed in 1949 and served as the university's library until 1989.

Johnson Hall (JOHN) is home to the College of Business and its associated academic departments (accounting and business law; economics, finance, and marketing; decision sciences and management; and MBA studies). Constructed in 1970, the building is named after Louis Johnson, the first dean of the College of Business. Johnson Hall includes the 150-seat Don Ervin Auditorium and the Heidtke Trading Room.
Kittrell Hall (KITT) is home to the Department of Earth Sciences. This building was constructed in 1916 as a women's dormitory for Tennessee Polytechnic Institute (Bartoo Hall, on the opposite side of the quad, was the men's dorm). Originally known simply as East Hall, the building was renamed for Tom William Kittrell, the university's bursar from 1918 to 1967. Kittrell Hall is nicknamed "Rock Lodge" for the numerous rocks and geologic formations on display in and around the building. Kittrell Hall is undergoing renovations as of July 2018.
Laboratory Science Commons (LSC) is the home of the Department of Chemistry, molecular biology faculty in the Department of Biology, and some faculty in the Departments of Physics and Earth Sciences. Construction was completed on October 15, 2020, and the building began to be occupied in January 2021.
Lewis Hall (LEWS) is home to the Department of Manufacturing and Engineering Technology. Constructed in 1920 as an engineering and industrial arts shop, the building is named after William H. Lewis, former chairperson of the university's Department of Industrial Arts. The building is equipped with several instructional laboratories, including the Rapid Prototyping Laboratory.
Marc L. Burnett Student Recreation and Fitness Center is a 157,000 square foot facility that houses intramural sports, health promotions, varsity spirit squads, aerobics classes, a 25-yard swimming pool, and various fitness and exercise equipment. The building was completed in 2020 and construction was funded by student fees.
Matthews-Daniel Hall (MATT/DANL) is two connected buildings with one name. Matthews is home to the Tennessee Alcohol Safety Education Program, some faculty offices of the Department of Curriculum and Instruction, some faculty offices for the Department of Counseling and Psychology, Academic Development, the Center for Assessment and Improvement, and some psychology laboratories. Daniel is the location of the Department of Sociology and Political Science and the criminal justice program. The building is named for Charles D. Daniel, the university's first dean, and his wife, Mary Matthews Daniel.

Memorial Gym (MGYM) is home to the Department of Exercise Science, Physical Education and Wellness. The building includes a large gymnasium with a basketball court, two smaller intramural gymnasia, handball courts, and a swimming pool along with offices, classrooms, and apparatus rooms.
Oakley Hall, formerly South Hall (SOUT), is home to the School of Agriculture, the School of Human Ecology, and the Department of Foreign Languages. The building was constructed in 1931 for the school's home economics department and was renovated in the early 1950s. Oakley Hall is home to the Friday Cafe, which serves meals prepared by Human Ecology students and faculty. It was renamed in 2015 in honor of Millard and J.J. Oakley.
Old Maintenance Building (OLDM) is occupied by construction contractors and serves as the headquarters for the construction of the new laboratory sciences building.
Pennebaker Hall (PENN) is home to the Department of Biology and the Cooperative Fisheries Unit. Constructed in 1968, the building is named in honor of Gordon B. Pennebaker, former chairperson of the department. The Paul Hollister Herbarium, located within the building, contains over 10,000 pressed plant specimens. Behind the building is a greenhouse and garden area used by biology faculty and students for academic research. Birds, snakes and other wildlife are on display on the third floor.
Prescott Hall (PRSC) is home to the civil and environmental engineering and chemical engineering departments as well as the Center for Energy Systems Research and the Center for the Management, Utilization, and Protection of Water Resources. Situated on the western side of the engineering quad, this building was constructed in the 1960s and is named in for Wallace S. Prescott, a longtime university faculty member and administrator who served as president of TTU from 1985 to 1987.
Ray Morris Hall (RMH) is home to the Millard Oakley STEM Center, which coordinates the university's STEM outreach programs. The STEM Center opened in 2010. The building and the STEM Center are both named in honor of businessmen who provided funding for the center's establishment.
Robert & Gloria Bell Hall (BELL) is home to the Whitson-Hester School of Nursing and the J.J. Oakley Campus Health Services unit. Constructed in 2008, the building is named for Robert Bell, the university's president from 2000 to 2012, and his wife, Gloria. The building is equipped with a 60-station computer lab and patient care labs that simulate hospital settings. The building was constructed on the site of Smith Quad, a complex of dormitories demolished in the early 2000s.
Stonecipher Lecture Hall (SLH), named after Harry Stonecipher, the former president and chief executive officer of McDonnell Douglas and Boeing, and alumnus of the Department of Physics at Tennessee Tech. The building houses two large lecture halls used primarily for classes in the departments of Chemistry and Biology, and features a sundial on its south side.
Southwest Hall (SWH) houses the College of Interdisciplinary Studies and its three schools as well as the Child Development Lab. Formerly the Upper Cumberland Regional Health Facility, the university acquired this building in 2011.
T.J. Farr Building (FARR), home to the College of Education, the Department of Counseling and Psychology, and the university's Honors Program. The building is named for the former chairperson of the English and Education Departments.
Angelo & Jennette Volpe Library and Media Center (LIBR), the university's library. The library's main floor consists of a learning commons (including a coffee shop), and the third floor contains the library's stacks. The library also houses Tech's iCUBE, iMakerSpace, and tutoring center. Constructed in 1989, the library is named for Angelo Volpe, who served as the university's president from 1987 to 2000, and his wife, Jennette. Special collections include the donated papers of Joe L. Evins, Democratic U.S. Representative. Tennessee Tech also holds documents on the history of the Upper Cumberland region, which includes manuscripts, photographs, and archives.

Residential buildings

Traditional halls
Browning Hall (BRNG) is a men's residence hall located along the western end of Capitol Quad. This building, which shares a breezeway with Evins Hall, was constructed in 1966 along with Evins. It is named in honor of Gordon Browning, former governor of Tennessee (1937–1939, 1949–1953). As of July 2018, Browning is undergoing complete renovations.
Cooper Hall (COOP) is a women's residence hall located along the southern end of Capitol Quad. Constructed in 1966, this building was named in honor of Prentice Cooper, who served as governor of Tennessee from 1939 to 1945. Cooper Hall shares a breezeway with Dunn Hall.
Crawford Hall (CRAW) is a coed residence hall located at the southwestern corner of the Main Quad, and was constructed in 1962. It is named in honor of Leonard Crawford, the university's former Director of Alumni, Placement, and Field Service.
Dunn Hall (DUNN) is a women's residence hall located along the southern end of Capitol Quad. Constructed in 1966, the hall is named in honor of Winfield Dunn, former governor of Tennessee (1971–1975). It shares a breezeway with Cooper Hall.
Ellington Hall (ELLG) is a coed residence hall located along the northern end of Capitol Quad that shares a breezeway with Warf Hall. Constructed in 1971, it is named in honor of Buford Ellington, former governor of Tennessee (1959–1963, 1967–1971).
Evins Hall (EVIN) is a men's residence hall located along the western end of Capitol Quad. Constructed in 1966, it is named in honor of Joe L. Evins, who served in Congress from 1947 to 1977. Evins Hall shares a breezeway with Browning Hall. As of July 2018, Evins is undergoing complete renovations.
Jobe Hall (JOBE) is a coed residence hall that is open to all majors, located on the northern side of the Pinkerton Quad. Constructed in 1969, it is named for Elsie Jobe, the university's former Dean of Women. The building's eastern end is connected to the northern end of Murphy Hall.
M.S. Cooper Hall (MSCP) is a coed residence hall for international students, located along the western side of the Pinkerton Quad. Constructed in 1969, it is named for Mattie Sue Cooper, a former university reference librarian. M.S. Cooper Hall shares a breezeway with Pinkerton Hall.
Maddux Hall (MDDX) is a coed residence hall located along the eastern side of Capitol Quad. Constructed in 1966, the building is named in honor of Jared Maddux, a former lieutenant governor of Tennessee. Maddux Hall shares a breezeway with McCord Hall.
McCord Hall (MCRD) is a coed residence hall located along the eastern side of Capitol Quad. Constructed in 1966, the building is named in honor of Jim Nance McCord, who served as governor of Tennessee from 1945 to 1949. It shares a breezeway with Maddux Hall.
Murphy Hall (MURP) is a coed residence hall for students enrolled in the Honors Program, located along the eastern side of Pinkerton Quad. Constructed in 1969, it is named in honor of Elizabeth Swallows Murphy, the university's former Dean of Women. The northern end of Murphy Hall is connected to the eastern end of Jobe Hall.
Pinkerton Hall (PINK) is a coed residence hall located along the western side of Pinkerton Quad. Constructed in 1969, it is named in honor of Herman and Marguerite Pinkerton, longtime university administrators. It shares a breezeway with M.S. Cooper Hall.
Warf Hall (WARF) is a coed residence hall located along the northern side of Capitol Quad. Constructed in 1971, it is named in honor of Howard Warf, who served as the Tennessee Commissioner of Education from 1963 to 1971. Warf shares a breezeway with Ellington Hall.

Suites
New Hall North (NEWN) is a coed residence hall located along the south side of the Pinkerton Quad. It was constructed in 2010.
New Hall South (NEWS) is a coed residence hall located adjacent to New Hall North at the southern end of the Pinkerton Quad. It was constructed in 2003.

Tech Village
Tech Village is a complex of one-bedroom and two-bedroom apartments located on the west side of campus.

Maintenance buildings
Facilities/Business Services Building (MTNO) houses offices and storage space for the Department of Facilities.
George and Ridley Carr Building (MTNS) houses shop space for the Department of Facilities.
Motor Pool Garage (MTNG) houses offices and storage space for the Department of Facilities as well as garages for university-owned vehicles.
Otis Carroll Building (CHIL) houses the university's chiller plant.
University Police Building (UPD) houses Reserve Officer Training Corps (ROTC). The building originally served as the campus infirmary.
University Services Building (USVC) houses the university's heating plant, the Office of Printing Services, and telecommunications. The building was constructed in 1929.
Warehouse (WHSE) houses offices and storage space for the Department of Facilities.

Parks and open spaces

Gerald D. Coorts Memorial Arboretum is located in the area between the buildings on the eastern side of the Main Quad and Dixie Avenue.
Main Quad is a large grassy lawn surrounded by trees located at the center of the Main Quadrangle. The adjacent road has been designated a greenway and is generally off-limits to vehicular traffic.
Sherlock Park was a partially-wooded park located west of the Engineering Quad. In 2021, the park was demolished to make way for the Ashraf Islam Engineering building, the university's main engineering department building. 
Centennial Plaza is a partially-wooded courtyard located south of the Roaden University Center.

Off-campus units
Hyder-Burks Agricultural Pavilion is a  complex located about a mile west of the main campus on Highway 290 (Gainesboro Grade). Operated by the School of Agriculture, the pavilion includes a main show arena, sales arena, barn, and picnic shelter. Constructed in the mid-1990s, the pavilion is named for W. Clyde Hyder, a former animal sciences professor, and Tommy Burks, a former state senator. Hyder-Burks is also connected to Shipley Farm, in Cookeville, Tennessee, and Oakley Farm, in Livingston, Tennessee.
Hyder-Burks Agricultural Pavilion is a  complex located about a mile west of the main campus on Highway 290 (Gainesboro Grade). Operated by the School of Agriculture, the pavilion includes a main show arena, sales arena, barn, and picnic shelter. Constructed in the mid-1990s, the pavilion is named for W. Clyde Hyder, a former animal sciences professor, and Tommy Burks, a former state senator. Hyder-Burks is also connected to Shipley Farm, in Cookeville, Tennessee, and Oakley Farm, in Livingston, Tennessee.

Academics

Departments
Tennessee Tech has  bachelor's degree programs and graduate programs as well as doctoral programs in the fields of education, engineering, and environmental sciences. TTU emphasizes a focus in STEM degrees but also provides infrastructure for traditional programs including liberal arts and nursing.

 College of Agriculture and Human Ecology
 School of Agriculture
 School of Human Ecology
 College of Arts and Sciences
 Biology
 Chemistry
 Communication
 Counseling and Psychology
 Earth Sciences
 English
 Foreign Languages
 General Education
 History
 Mathematics
 Physics
 Pre-professional Health Sciences
 Sociology and Political Science
 Wildlife and Fisheries Science
 Women and Gender Studies (minor only)
 College of Business
 Accounting
 Business Management
 Business and Information Technology
 Business Intelligence and Analytics
 General Management
 Human Resource Management
 Production and Operations Management
 Economics
 Finance
 Marketing
 College of Education
 Counseling and Psychology
 Curriculum and Instruction
 Physical Education
 College of Engineering
 Basic Engineering
 Chemical Engineering
 Civil and Environmental Engineering
Structural Engineering and Structural Mechanics
Transportation Engineering
Environmental Engineering
Water Resources Engineering
Geotechnical Engineering
 Computer Science
 Electrical and Computer Engineering
 Manufacturing and Engineering Technology
 Mechanical Engineering
Mechatronics Engineering
Vehicle Engineering
College of Fine Arts
 Art
 Music
 College of Graduate Studies
 College of Interdisciplinary Studies
 School of Environmental Studies
 School of Interdisciplinary Studies
 School of Professional Studies
School of Art, Craft, & Design
Art Education
Clay
Design (Digital Media)
General Fine Arts: Dual-Focus
Fibers
Glass
Metals
Painting
Wood
 Whitson-Hester School of Nursing

Programs
 Cooperative Education
 Educational Technology
 Distance MBA
 Honors
 Military Science

Research Centers
 Center for Energy Systems Research (CESR) is an interdisciplinary facility dedicated to research in various problems pertaining to energy and infrastructure. The facility pursues research in "solar energy, energy storage, smart grid power systems, power electronics, wind energy, distributed power plant performance improvement, cement, concrete, bridge and structure health monitoring, flood flow modeling, advanced communications, and cyber security."
 Center for Manufacturing Research (CMR) is a facility appropriated by the College of Engineering for the research in areas related to manufacturing. It has been designated as a Center of Excellence by the state of Tennessee.
 Center for the Management, Utilization & Protection of Water Resources is an interdisciplinary research center that focuses its research on biodiversity, enabling technologies and tools, water security and sustainability, and the water-energy-food nexus. It has been designated as a Center of Excellence by the state of Tennessee.
 Millard Oakley STEM Center for Teaching & Learning in Science, Technology, Engineering, & Mathematics (STEM) actively promotes and supports quality STEM outreach programs in the Upper Cumberland region and throughout the state of Tennessee. The staff at the center work with Tech faculty across several disciplines to offer standards-aligned STEM outreach programs, promote STEM-related activities, and disseminate STEM education resources.
Cybersecurity Education, Research, and Outreach Center (CEROC) aims to integrate university-wide existing activities and initiatives in cybersecurity education, research, and outreach. It has been designated as a National Center of Academic Excellence in Cyber Defense Education through 2021.
Tennessee Cooperative Fishery Research Unit (TNCFRU) works closely with the Center for the Management, Utilization, and Protection of Water Resources to "enhance graduate education in fisheries and wildlife sciences and to facilitate research between natural resource agencies and universities on topics of mutual concern."

Athletics 

The Tennessee Tech athletic program is a member of the Ohio Valley Conference (OVC) and competes in the NCAA Division I Football Championship Subdivision. The school's teams are known as the Golden Eagles, the team colors are purple and gold, and the mascot is Awesome Eagle.

Traditions and campus lore

 Golden Eagle: The statue now atop Derryberry Hall was stolen by three students (Tom Moran, Roy Loudermilk, and Lewis Brown) from the lawn of the burned-out Monteagle Hotel in Monteagle, Tennessee, in November 1952. The three had hoped the eagle would provide the ultimate prop for the pep rally prior to the football game against then-rival Middle Tennessee State University (MTSU). The hotel's owner, John Harton (a former state treasurer), demanded the return of the statue and initially rejected all offers to purchase it. He finally relented and sold the statue for $500 after Governor Frank G. Clement intervened. It was moved to its current position atop Derryberry in 1961.
 "Dammit" the dog: A former university president once said "dammit" to a dog in front of a crowd, covering by saying that was the dog's name. Dammit has his own tombstone, an operable fire hydrant, on campus opposite Derryberry Hall.
 The "Blizzard" is a tradition which started in 1984, when students celebrated the first successful shot made by Tennessee Tech in a basketball game against MTSU by throwing showers of "Tech Squares" (toilet paper) into the air. Since MTSU moved to the Sun Belt Conference, the Blizzard is now performed against Austin Peay State University.

Notable people

Faculty

Greg Danner, professor of music; composer
Michael M. Gunter, professor of political science; Fulbright lecturer, authority on the Kurds and the Middle East
Joseph Hermann, Emeritus Director of Bands; Past-President of the American Bandmasters Association
R. Winston Morris – Emeritus Professor of tuba and euphonium; innovator in the fields of tuba performance, education, and chamber music

Alumni

 Jarrod Alonge, comedian and musician
 Blanton Alspaugh, Grammy-winning producer
 Rodney Atkins, Country music singer
Paul Bailey, Tennessee state senator
 Jimmy Bedford, sixth master distiller at Jack Daniel's
 Frank Buck, Former Tennessee State Representative
 Rick Camp, professional baseball player
 Roger K. Crouch, NASA astronaut
 Trae Crowder, professional comedian
 Lincoln Davis, former U.S. congressman
 Ron Estes, U.S. congressman from Kansas
 Anthony Fisher (born 1986), basketball player in the Israeli Basketball Premier League
 Rich Froning Jr., four-time CrossFit Games Champion
 Elois Grooms, former NFL player
 Johnny H. Hayes, former TVA director and presidential campaign finance manager
 Caleb Hemmer, Tennessee State Representative
 Mike Hennigan, former NFL linebacker
 Dwight Henry, former Tennessee state legislator and gubernatorial candidate
Jake Hoot, Country music singer and winner of The Voice (American season 17)
 Bill Jenkins, former U.S. congressman
 Kenneth Jernigan, advocate for the blind, former head of the National Federation of the Blind
 Andy Landers, women's basketball coach at the University of Georgia
 Adam Liberatore, MLB pitcher for the Los Angeles Dodgers
 James A. Lindsay, author, cultural critic, and mathematician
 Barbara McConnell, New Jersey state legislator
 Kevin Murphy, NBA player for the Utah Jazz
 Frank Omiyale, NFL player
 Da'Rick Rogers, NFL player
 John Rose, U.S. Representative for Tennessee's 6th Congressional District 
 Erik Sabel, former MLB player
 Daron Schoenrock, college baseball coach at Memphis
 David Simmons, Florida state senator
 Yongduan Song, computer scientist
 Ken Sparks, football coach at Carson-Newman College
 Scott Stallings, professional golfer
 Carl Stiner, former Commander in Chief of the United States Special Operations Command
 Harry Stonecipher, former CEO of Boeing, McDonnell Douglas, and Sundstrand
 Barry A. Vann, author, lecturer
 Lonnie Warwick, former NFL player
 Dottie West, country singer
 Barry Wilmore, NASA astronaut and United States Navy test pilot
 Jim Youngblood, former American football linebacker in the National Football League for the Los Angeles Rams and Washington Redskins

References

External links

 
 Tennessee Tech Athletics website

 
Public universities and colleges in Tennessee
Education in Putnam County, Tennessee
Educational institutions established in 1915
Universities and colleges accredited by the Southern Association of Colleges and Schools
Buildings and structures in Putnam County, Tennessee
1915 establishments in Tennessee
Technological universities in the United States
Engineering universities and colleges in Tennessee
Glassmaking schools